John C. Sherburne (August 31, 1883 – June 30, 1959) was a Vermont attorney and judge.  His career was most notable for his service as an associate justice of the Vermont Supreme Court from 1934 to 1949, and the court's Chief Justice from 1949 to 1955.

Early life
John Calvin Sherburne was born in Pomfret, Vermont on August 31, 1883, the son of John C. and Cynthia E. (Giddlings) Sherburne.  The elder John C. Sherburne held several local offices in Pomfret, and served as a member of the Vermont House of Representatives.

The younger John Sherburne was educated in Pomfret, and graduated from Woodstock High School.  He then attended the University of Vermont, from which he graduated in 1904.  Sherburne was a member of Delta Psi and Phi Beta Kappa.  From 1904 to 1907 he studied at Wadham College of Oxford University as a Rhodes Scholar, the first Vermonter to attain this distinction.

During the summer breaks from his university courses, Sherburne studied law in the Bethel office of Hunton and Stickney.  Upon returning to the United States, he settled in Randolph, where he was admitted to the bar and began a practice.

Start of career
In addition to practicing law, Sherburne was a referee in bankruptcy from 1908 to 1916.  A Republican in politics, from 1917 to 1921 he was State's Attorney of Orange County.  In 1920, he was elected to the Vermont Senate, and he served one term.  From January 1923 to April 1926, he was Secretary of Civil and Military Affairs (chief assistant) during the governorships of Redfield Proctor Jr. and Franklin S. Billings.

Judicial career
In April, 1926, Sherburne was appointed a judge of the Vermont Superior Court.  In 1934, he was appointed an associate justice of the Vermont Supreme Court, filling the vacancy left by the death of Warner A. Graham.  He was appointed Chief Justice in 1949, filling the vacancy created by the retirement of Sherman R. Moulton, and was succeeded as an associate justice by Samuel H. Blackmer.  Sherburne served as chief justice until retiring in 1955, and was succeeded by Olin M. Jeffords.

Honors
In 1919, Sherburne received the honorary degree of LL.D. from the University of Vermont.

Death and burial
Sherburne died at his home in Randolph on June 30, 1959, as the result of injuries he sustained after a fall down the stairs while moving a suitcase in preparation for a trip to visit his sister in Connecticut.  He was buried at South View Cemetery in Randolph.

Family
On May 1, 1913, Sherburne married Alice Charlotte McIntyre (1885-1962).  They were the parents of two children, son Henry M. and daughter Frances E.

References

Sources

Books

Newspapers

Internet

External links
John C. Sherburne at The Political Graveyard

1883 births
1959 deaths
People from Pomfret, Vermont
People from Randolph, Vermont
University of Vermont alumni
American Rhodes Scholars
Alumni of Wadham College, Oxford
U.S. state supreme court judges admitted to the practice of law by reading law
Vermont lawyers
State's attorneys in Vermont
Republican Party Vermont state senators
Justices of the Vermont Supreme Court
Burials in Vermont
20th-century American politicians
20th-century American judges
20th-century American lawyers